Wilsons Creek is a  waterway near Springfield, Missouri, United States. It is formed by the confluence of Jordan Creek and Fassnight Creek in southwest Springfield, just south of Bennett Street between Scenic Avenue and Kansas Expressway. It was the site of the Civil War Battle of Wilson's Creek and flows south through Wilson's Creek National Battlefield. It is a tributary of the James River which it joins in western Christian County. At Battlefield, the creek has an annual average discharge of 95 cubic feet per second.

The creek has the name of James Wilson, a pioneer citizen.

Location

Mouth Confluence with the James River, Christian County, Missouri: 
Source Confluence of Fassnight Creek and Jordan Creek, Springfield, Greene County, Missouri:

References

Rivers of Missouri
Tributaries of the White River (Arkansas–Missouri)
Rivers of Christian County, Missouri
Rivers of Greene County, Missouri